Matthews Kambale (born 27 December 1952) is a Malawian former long-distance runner.

At the 1972 Summer Olympics in Munich, Matthews ran the men's marathon, finishing in 56th place with a time of 2:45:50. Kambale competed in both the 10,000 metres and the marathon at the 1984 Summer Olympics in Los Angeles: He finished twelfth in heat two of the 10,000 metres and so failed to qualify for the next round, and he did not complete the marathon.

He finished 26th in the 1982 Commonwealth Games marathon.

References

1952 births
Living people
Malawian male long-distance runners
Olympic athletes of Malawi
Athletes (track and field) at the 1972 Summer Olympics
Athletes (track and field) at the 1984 Summer Olympics
Commonwealth Games competitors for Malawi
Athletes (track and field) at the 1982 Commonwealth Games